Antoine Lagree Simpson (born December 7, 1976) is a former American football defensive tackle. He played college football at Houston after transferring from Fort Scott Community College. An undrafted free agent, he played for the Miami Dolphins in 1999 and for the San Diego Chargers in 2000.

References

1976 births
Living people
American football defensive tackles
Houston Cougars football players
Miami Dolphins players
San Diego Chargers players
Fort Scott Greyhounds football players
La Porte High School (Texas) alumni
Players of American football from Gary, Indiana